Sunrise Reprise is a 2021 studio album by saxophonist Chris Potter, his third released on Edition Records. For this album, Potter reunited with keyboardist James Francies and drummer Eric Harland from his 2019 studio album Circuits. It was the first album the three musicians recorded after a period of quarantine due to the COVID-19 pandemic.

Track listing

Personnel 
Musicians
 Chris Potter – tenor saxophone, soprano saxophone, clarinet, flute, keyboards, producer
 James Francies – piano, keyboards
 Eric Harland – drums

Production
 Dave Stapleton – executive producer
 Louise Holland – executive producer
 Josh Giunta – recording
 Christopher Allen – mixing
 Huntley Miller – mastering
 Oli Bentley – artwork
 Dave Stapleton – photography

References 

Edition Records albums
2021 albums
Chris Potter (jazz saxophonist) albums